Sitara-e-Basalat is a non-operational gallantry (courageous behaviour, especially in battle) award of Pakistan Armed Forces given to individuals for distinguished acts of gallantry, valor or courage while performing their duty

It is given by President of Pakistan on the recommendation of service chief.

See also 
 Awards and decorations of the Pakistan Armed Forces
 Sawar Khan
 Imtiaz Bhatti

References

External links 
 Decorations and Medals of Pakistan
 Military Awards of Pakistan

Military awards and decorations of Pakistan